Midland District was one of four districts of the Province of Quebec created in 1788 in the western reaches of the Montreal District and partitioned in 1791 to create the new colony of Upper Canada.

Historical evolution
The District, originally known as Mecklenburg District (named after Mecklenburg Castle in the Mecklenburg region of Germany), was constituted in 1788 in the Province of Quebec, and was described as:

In 1792, the following electoral counties were established in the District:

 Addington
 Frontenac
 Hastings
 Lennox
 Ontario
 Prince Edward

The District was renamed as "Midland District" in 1792, and its jail and courthouse were established in Kingston.

At the beginning of 1800, Lennox and Addington were combined to form the incorporated counties of Lennox and Addington, and the islands comprising Ontario were divided between Frontenac and Lennox and Addington. The general boundaries of the District were also altered so that it comprised:

Prince Edward County was separated in 1831 to form Prince Edward District, and Hastings County was split off in 1837 to form Victoria District. Lennox and Addington  regained their separate identities in 1845, but still remained united for electoral purposes.

At the beginning of 1850, the district was abolished, and the United Counties of Frontenac, Lennox and Addington replaced it for municipal and judicial purposes.

See also
 Kingston Collegiate and Vocational Institute - founded in 1807 as Midland Grammar School replacing Kingston Grammar School (c. 1792)

Further reading
Armstrong, Frederick H. Handbook of Upper Canadian Chronology. Toronto : Dundurn Press, 1985. 
 Changing Shape of Ontario: Early Districts and Counties

References 

Districts of Upper Canada
1788 establishments in the Province of Quebec (1763–1791)
1849 disestablishments in Canada